FK Župa Superpetrol (Serbian Cyrillic: ФК Жупа Суперпетрол) is a football club based in the village of Milosavci, Republika Srpska, Bosnia and Herzegovina. It competes in the Second League of Republika Srpska.

The club was founded on August 20, 1977, in the village Kriškovci. They play their matches on Stadium Bare, which capacity is 1,000 seats.

Team colors are yellow and blue.

External links 
 FK Župa Official website at FCZUPA.COM
 About FK Župa at rs-sport.org

1977 establishments in Yugoslavia
Association football clubs established in 1977
Football clubs in Bosnia and Herzegovina